

Former production vehicles

Concept Models
 Saturn Prototype (1984)
 Saturn Prototype (1988)
 Saturn Sport Sedan Concept (1990)
 Saturn SC Performance Edition (1999)
 Saturn CV-1 (2000)
 Saturn SCX (2001)
 Saturn LST (2001)
 Saturn VUE Urban Expression (2001)
 Saturn VUE Outdoor Expression (2001)
 Saturn Sky Concept (2002)
 Saturn ION·EFX (2002)
 Saturn ION QC/T (2003)
 Saturn ION Rally (2003)
 Saturn VUE Red Line Street Play (2004)
 Saturn VUE "Spring Special" (2004)
 Saturn Curve (2004)
 Saturn AURA Concept (2005)
 Saturn PreVue (2006)
 Saturn Astra Tuner (2007)
 Saturn Flextreme (2008)
 Saturn VUE Greenline Hyline (2008)
 Saturn VUE Hybrid 2-Mode (2009)

 
Saturn